Varatchaya Wongteanchai was the defending champion, having won the event in 2013, but lost in the first round to Dalila Jakupović.

Zarina Diyas won the tournament, defeating Noppawan Lertcheewakarn in the final, 6–1, 6–1.

Seeds

Main draw

Finals

Top half

Bottom half

References 
 Main draw

Blossom Cup - Singles
Industrial Bank Cup